The Constitution of the Federated States of Micronesia is the supreme law of the Federated States of Micronesia. It was adopted in 1979.

History 
Constitutional drafting began in June 1975. It was ratified on October 1, 1978, and took effect on May 10, 1979; May 10 is celebrated as Constitution Day. The constitution has been amended once, in 1990.

Constitution 
The constitution is based on that of the United States, Micronesia's former trustee. It provides for a separation of powers between the executive, legislative, and judicial branches, as well as a federal system.

However, unlike the United States, Micronesia has a unicameral legislature, called the National Congress, with fourteen senators. Four of them represent the four states for four-year terms, and the other ten representatives apportioned by population and serve two-year terms. Also, the National Congress is responsible for electing the President and Vice President. Most government functions other than foreign policy and national defense are carried out by the State governments. The constitution prohibits non-citizens from owning land in FSM.

Articles 
The constitution consists of a preamble, and sixteen articles.

Article I 
Article I defines the territory of the Federated States of Micronesia.

Article II 
Article II ensures the constitution's supremacy over other laws.

Article III 
Article III is the nationality law of the Federated States of Micronesia.

Articles IV, V, and VI 
Articles IV, V, and VI act as the bill of rights for the Federated States of Micronesia, with Article V specifically protecting traditional rights of tribal leaders, and Article VI granting suffrage to those over eighteen years of age.

Articles VII-XI 
Articles VII-XI set out of the government of the Federated States of Micronesia, with a separation of powers among three branches—the executive (Article X), legislative (Article IX), and judicial (article XI). Article VII creates a federal system with a national government, as well as state and local ones. Article VIII separates powers among these three levels.

Article XII 
Article XII concerns government finance.

Article XIII 
Article XIII consists of general provisions.

Article XIV 
Article XIV sets out the process of amending the constitution.

Articles XV and XVI 
Articles XV and XVI are transitional provisions.

References

Micronesia
Law of the Federated States of Micronesia
Government of the Federated States of Micronesia